The  Muhammad Nawaz Sharif University of Engineering and Technology (MNSUET) is a public university located in Multan, Punjab, Pakistan. It was established in 2012 on the initiative of Chief Minister Punjab Mian Muhammad Shahbaz Sharif.  The Act of Muhammad Nawaz Sharif University of Engineering and Technology Multan was approved in 2014.  The university is named after Nawaz Sharif.

Departments
The university consists of the following departments:

 Chemical Engineering and Technology Department
 Electrical Engineering and Technology Department
 Mechanical Engineering and Technology Department
 Civil Engineering and Technology Department
 Computer Science Department
 Basic Sciences and Humanities Department
 Management Sciences Department

Programs
The university offers the following degree programs:

Undergraduate programs
 BSc Chemical Engineering 
 BSc Electrical Engineering 
 BSc Mechanical Engineering Technology 
 BSc Civil Engineering Technology
 BSc Electrical Engineering Technology
 BS Computer Science
 BS Physics
 BS Chemistry
 BS Mathematics
 Bachelor of Business Administration (BBA)
 B.Sc. Architectural Engineering Technology

Postgraduate programs
 MSc Chemical Engineering
 MSc Electrical Engineering
 Ph.D. Chemical Engineering

Campus
The current campus of the university is located in the premises of Government College of Technology (GCT), Qasimpur Colony, Near BCG Chowk, Bahawalpur Road, Multan. A piece of land has been purchased by Government of the Punjab for the construction of new campus is in process. Almost 70% of the construction in Phase-1 is completed. It consists of 210 acres and is situated near town  on the same Bahawalpur Road (4.25 kilometers off the main highway and to the east, near Chak 14/Faiz) N-5 National Highway, 21 kilometers away from the current campus.

Former Vice Chancellors

IT Infrastructure and Labs 
The university uses BoltFlare Enterprise Hosting to ensure the smooth running of all its official websites  and Microsoft 365 for emails, making communication with students, Faculty and staff efficient and secure. State of the Art Computer, Engineering and Technology Labs are established for students. Dr. Samina Naz, Assistant Professor has been assigned the additional duties of Incharge, Computer Science Department.

See also
 List of universities in Pakistan
 List of engineering universities and colleges in Pakistan

References

External links
 MNSUET official website

Public universities and colleges in Punjab, Pakistan
2012 establishments in Pakistan
Universities and colleges in Multan
Educational institutions established in 2012
Engineering universities and colleges in Pakistan